Jarauna railway station (JUA) is a railway station on the Jaunpur, Uttar Pradesh–Janghai line, Jaunpur, Uttar Pradesh, India. It is connected with the villages of Meerganj. It is on the Indian railway route from Allahabad to Jaunpur.

References

Railway stations in Jaunpur district
Lucknow NR railway division